Apagomera is a genus of longhorn beetles of the subfamily Lamiinae, containing the following species:

 Apagomera aereiventris (Tippmann, 1960)
 Apagomera bravoi Galileo & Martins, 2009
 Apagomera jaguarari Galileo & Martins, 1998
 Apagomera seclusa Lane, 1965
 Apagomera tipitinga Galileo & Martins, 1998
 Apagomera triangularis (Germar, 1824)

References

Hemilophini